Lebia darlingtoniana is a species of beetle in the family Carabidae.

Description

Distribution
The species can be found in Papua New Guinea and Indonesia (Irian Jaya, Batanta island, and Waywesar).

References

Beetles described in 2004
Lebia
Beetles of Asia
Insects of Papua New Guinea